Nikola Dabanović (Montenegrin Cyrillic: Никола Дабановић; born 18 December 1981) is a Montenegrin football referee who officiates in the Montenegrin First League. He has been a FIFA referee since 2009, and is ranked as a UEFA first category referee.

Refereeing career
In 2006, Dabanović began officiating in the Montenegrin First League. In 2009, he was put on the FIFA referees list. He officiated his first senior international match on 10 August 2011 between Bosnia and Herzegovina and Greece.

Dabanović was selected as an official for the 2014 UEFA European Under-17 Championship in Malta and the 2019 UEFA European Under-19 Championship in Armenia.

Personal life
Dabanović was born in Podgorica, Montenegro. He works as an account manager.

References

External links
 
 Nikola Dabanović referee profile at EU-Football.info
 

1981 births
Living people
Sportspeople from Podgorica
Montenegrin football referees